The Heart of Midlothian is a 1914 British silent historical film directed by Frank Wilson and starring Flora Morris, Violet Hopson and Alma Taylor. It is an adaptation of Sir Walter Scott's 1818 novel The Heart of Midlothian.

The American company Famous Players released a rival film in May 1914 on the same subject called A Woman's Triumph.

Cast
 Flora Morris as Effie Deans  
 Violet Hopson as Jeanie Deans  
 Alma Taylor as Madge Wildfire 
 Stewart Rome as The Outlaw 
 Cecil Mannering as George Staunton  
 Cyril Morton as Reuben Butler 
 Harry Gilbey as Duke of Argyll  
 Warwick Buckland as Davie Deans 
 Marie de Solla as Old Margery  
 Harry Royston as Bartoline Saddletree  
 Harry Buss as The Officer  
 Hay Plumb as Fiscal Sharpitlaw 
 John MacAndrews as The Gaoler

References

Bibliography
 Palmer, Scott. British Film Actors' Credits, 1895-1987. McFarland, 1988.

External links

1914 films
1910s historical drama films
British historical drama films
British silent feature films
Films based on works by Walter Scott
Films based on British novels
Films directed by Frank Wilson
Films set in Scotland
British black-and-white films
Hepworth Pictures films
1914 drama films
1910s English-language films
1910s British films
Silent historical drama films